The Great Synagogue of Florence or Tempio Maggiore is one of the largest synagogues in South-central Europe, situated in Florence, in Italy. The synagogue of Florence was one of the most important synagogues built in Europe in the age of the Jewish emancipation, reached by the Jewish communities living in the Grand Duchy of Tuscany in 1848.

History and architecture
In 1848 in the Duchy of Tuscany, the Jewish community were given the status of free citizens. They thought of building a new synagogue to symbolize this change. But only later, could they raise the funds to build such a structure. David Levi, a president of the Jewish community, bequeathed his estate after his death in 1870 to build a new synagogue. The 'Israelitic Temple' was built between 1874 and 1882. 

Their design integrated the Italian architectural tradition with the Moorish style used for the decoration. The Moorish style was considered appropriate for a synagogue because it was never used for churches and, in the case of the new Synagogue of Florence, it was built in the Sefardic style. It served to remind Jews of the origins of Sefardic Jewry in Berber Moorish Spain.

Layers of travertine and granite alternate in the masonry, creating a striped effect.  Old photographs show bold red and beige stripes, but the bold colors of the stone have faded over time, leaving a more mottled effect.

The overall plan of the synagogue is quadrangular. The central dome raised on pendentives is reminiscent of the Hagia Sophia in Istanbul, which was built as a Byzantine Empire church, and many mosques were inspired by it.  The corner towers are topped with horseshoe-arched towers, which have onion domes in the Moorish Revival style.  Three horseshoe arches form the main entrance, above which rise tiers of ajimez windows, with their paired horseshoe arches sharing a single column. The natural copper roof was oxidized to green so that it would stand out in the Florentine skyline.

Inside the building "every square inch is covered with colored designs," in Moorish patterns. The interior mosaics and frescoes are by Giovanni Panti. Giacomo del Medico designed the great arch. 

During World War II, Nazis soldiers occupied the synagogue, using it as a storehouse. In August 1944 retreating German troops worked with Italian Fascists to lay explosives to destroy the synagogue. But, Italian resistance fighters defused most of the explosives and only a limited amount of damage was done. The synagogue was fully restored after the war. Like many other buildings, it suffered damage after the flood of the River Arno in 1966, but another restoration was undertaken to correct the damage.

Replicas of the Great Synagogue
The Great synagogue of Florence has been widely admired.
Today it is often visited and it is possible to visit it every day, except on Saturdays.

The 1922 Beth Am Synagogue (formerly Chizuk Amuno), (Baltimore, Maryland) is of similar scale and character, using a number of design elements from the Great Synagogue.
The 1894 Second Luxembourg Synagogue was built as a replica of the Great Synagogue.

Jewish Museum

Jewish community in Florence

Today the Jewish community in Florence is composed of about 1,400 people. It has a long history, reaching to the medieval era. In addition, a nearby Jewish community in the Oltrarno area, south of the Arno river, dates to the Roman era. Jews had a community in Rome since before the Common Era. It is thought that the first synagogue was probably built in the 13th century.

References

External links

Buildings and structures in Florence
Moorish Revival synagogues in Italy
Orthodox synagogues in Italy
Synagogues completed in 1882
Synagogues in Italy
Tourist attractions in Florence
Synagogue buildings with domes
Jews and Judaism in Florence